Devin Mills is an American actress. She created the online series Dating In The Middle Ages, a musical comedy about a divorced historical romance novelist (Samanta Collins, played by Mills) who is returning to the dating scene.

In 2006, Mills appeared in the short film Shank. Mills played on the television series General Hospital in 2008 and Days of Our Lives in 2009 as well as Big Love and The O.C.. In 2011, she appeared in the short Party Foul.

Filmography

References

External links
 IMDb
 About page on Rogue Cowgirl Productions
 Dating in the Middle Ages

Year of birth missing (living people)
Living people
21st-century American actresses